Polygonatum odoratum (syn. P. officinale), the angular Solomon's seal, सेतक चिनी (खिराउलो)(Nepal) or scented Solomon's seal, is a species of flowering plant in the family Asparagaceae, native to Europe, the Caucasus, Siberia, the Russian Far East, China, Mongolia, Korea, Nepal and Japan. In the United Kingdom it is one of three native species of the genus, the others being P. multiflorum and P. verticillatum.

The genus name Polygonatum comes from the Greek words "poly", meaning "many", and "gonu", meaning "knee joint". This is in reference to the plant's jointed rhizomes. The Latin specific epithet odoratum means "scented".

Description
The scented tubular flowers are white with green tips, borne in spring and hanging from the underside of the stems.

Cultivation
Polygonatum odoratum, like its relative lily of the valley, is cultivated in moist, shaded situations, where it will spread by underground stolons. Cultivars include 'Flore pleno' and 'Variegatum'.

Use

Polygonatum odoratum is used in traditional Chinese medicine and Traditional Korean medicine, where it is called yùzhú (玉竹) and dunggulle (둥굴레) respectively. In Korea, the root of the plant is used to make tea.

This plant species is described in the work Plantas Medicinales (medicinal plants) of Pius Font i Quer. According to it, its rhizome contains asparagine, mucilage, a cardio-tonic glycoside, saponin, and quinine gluconate. It has been used for intestinal problems and pain, for rheumatism, gout, water retention, and as a diuretic. He says that the scientific medicine has used it to treat diabetes. He also describes a digestive liquor that uses the rhizome of this plant.

The young shoots of the plants may be boiled and served like asparagus. The stems, leaves, and berries, however, must be treated with caution, as they are thought to be toxic if consumed in large quantities.

Varieties
Four varieties are recognized:
Polygonatum odoratum var. maximowiczii (F.Schmidt) Koidz. – Japan, Russian Far East
Polygonatum odoratum var. odoratum – widespread from Portugal and Great Britain to Japan and Kamchatka
Polygonatum odoratum var. pluriflorum (Miq.) Ohwi – Japan, Korea
Polygonatum odoratum var. thunbergii (C.Morren & Decne.) H.Hara – Japan, Korea

References

External links 
 Msu.edu: Polygonatum odoratum

odoratum
Flora of Europe
Flora of temperate Asia
Plants described in 1758
Garden plants of Asia
Garden plants of Europe
Medicinal plants of Asia
Medicinal plants of Europe